Hakin United are a Welsh football club from Milford Haven, Pembrokeshire in the southwest of Wales. They are the current league winners and currently play in the Pembrokeshire League Division One and managed by ex player Scott Davies. They are the league's most successful club, having  since the 1945–46 season, won the Division One championship twenty times, and finished as league runners-up twelve times.  The club also holds the record for the number of Pembrokeshire Senior Cups as twelve times winners.

The current club captain is Ashley Bevan.

In the 2022–23 Welsh Cup they pulled off major surprises when as a tier 5 club they beat tier 2 Afan Lido 0–1 in the first round, and followed that up in the second round when they also beat a tier 2 side Taff's Well 4–1.

History

Honours

 Pembrokeshire League Division One  - Champions (20): 1951–52; 1954–55; 1963–64; 1968–69; 1996–97; 1997–98; 1998–99; 1999–2000; 2000–01; 2001–02; 2002–03; 2008–09; 2010–11; 2012–13; 2013–14; 2014–15; 2016–17; 2017–18 2019-20; 2021-22
 Pembrokeshire League Division One  - Runners-Up (12): 1952–53; 1955–56; 1956–57; 1957–58; 1969–70; 1971–72; 1994–95; 1995–96; 2003–04; 2007–08; 2011–12; 2015–16
 Pembrokeshire League Division Two  - Champions (2): 1948–49, 2017–18
 Pembrokeshire League Division Two  - Runners-Up (1): 1972–73 (second team)
 Pembrokeshire League Division Three - Champions (1): 2010–11 (second team) 
 Pembrokeshire League Division Three  - Runners-Up (3): 1981–82 (second team); 1984–85 (second team); 1992–93 (second team)
 Pembrokeshire League Division Four - Champions (1): 1969–70 (second team) 
 Pembrokeshire League Reserves Division One - Champions (5): 1995–96; 1997–98; 1998–99; 1999–2000; 2000–01
 Pembrokeshire League Reserves Division One - Runners-Up (4): 1996–97; 2001–02; 2003–04; 2007–08
 Pembrokeshire Senior Cup - Winners (12): 1958–59; 1968–69; 1999–2000; 2000–01; 2001–02; 2002–03; 2005–06; 2008–09; 2010–11; 2011–12; 2017–18; 2021–22 
 Pembrokeshire Senior Cup - Runners-Up (3):1964-65; 1998–99; 2016–17
 West Wales Intermediate Cup - Winners (3): 1956–57; 1998–99; 2003–04
 West Wales Intermediate Cup - Runners-Up: 2000–01
 Joe Lennon Memorial Cup - Winners (9): 2012; 2013; 2014; 2015; 2016; 2017; 2018; 2019; 2021
 West Wales FA Senior Cup - Runners-Up: 2001-02
 Wiltshire Cup – Winners: 1975–76

References

External links
Official club Facebook
Official club Twitter

Football clubs in Wales
Sport in Pembrokeshire
Pembrokeshire League clubs
Milford Haven